Cisthene striata, the striated lichen moth, is a moth of the family Erebidae. It was described by Rodrigues Ottolengui in 1898. It is found in the US states of Maryland, Colorado, Georgia and Florida.

The wingspan is about 17 mm. Adults have been recorded on wing year round in Florida.

References

External links
Original description: Ottolengui, R. (1898). "A New Bombycid". The Canadian Entomologist.

Cisthenina
Moths described in 1898